The Apelin Receptor (APLNR, also known as APJ) is a G protein-coupled receptor.  APLNR possesses two endogenous ligands which are APELIN and ELABELA. The structure of APLNR was resolved in 2017

References

Further reading

External links